The Devon Metro is a proposed rapid transit–style service on the regional rail network in Exeter and its environs, which Devon County Council has been working to establish since 2011.

Routes 

Completed enhancements

Cranbrook station 

Cranbrook railway station opened in 2015.

Newcourt station 

Newcourt railway station opened in 2015.

Riviera Line timetable changes 
As part of the Devon Metro project, frequency on the Riviera Line between Exeter and Paignton was increased to four trains per hour, which has also had the effect of increasing the frequency of the Avocet Line to Exmouth.

Also as part of the project, in the 2020 timetable change, the Tarka Line service between Barnstaple and Exeter was segregated from the service on the Avocet and Riviera Lines from Exmouth to Paignton via Exeter. It has been proposed that the Tarka Line could now be extended east from Exeter to Honiton along the West of England Main Line.

Ongoing work

Marsh Barton station 

Construction work started at Marsh Barton in April 2021. The station was added to the National Rail timetable in May 2022.

Proposals 

Furthermore, the council wishes for the Dartmoor Railway to be extended to serve the town of Tavistock, which would revive a connection provided until 1968 by the Exeter to Plymouth railway of the LSWR.

References 

Rail transport in Devon
Transport in Exeter